The Keystone B-3A was a bomber aircraft developed for the United States Army Air Corps by Keystone Aircraft in the late 1920s.

Design and development
The B-3 was originally ordered as the LB-10A (a single-tail modification of the Keystone LB-6), but the Army dropped the LB- 'light bomber' designation in 1930.

Although the performance of the B-3A was hardly better than that of the bombers flown at the end of World War I, it had come a long way. In terms of its safety, it was far superior to its oldest predecessors.

Operational history
The B-3A was a member of the last family of biplanes operated by the US Army; it remained in service until 1940. A few years after it was first produced, the introduction of all-metal monoplanes rendered it almost completely obsolete.

Variants
LB-10
The last of the 17 LB-6s ordered (S/N 29-27) was converted with a re-designed single fin and rudder and two 525 hp Wright R-1750E engines.  Delivered to Wright Field on 7 July 1929, it was wrecked on 12 November 1929.
LB-10A
This version used Pratt and Whitney R-1690-3 Hornet engines and was slightly smaller, in both wingspan and fuselage. A total of 63 were ordered (S/N 30-281/343).  All were re-designated as the B-3A before any deliveries were made, with the final 27 built as B-5A with Wright engines.
B-3A
Ordered as LB-10A, 36 delivered as B-3A (S/N 30-281/316). The first aircraft was delivered in October 1930.
B-5A
Ordered as B-3A, re-engined with Wright R-1750-3 Cyclone engines, 27 built (S/N 30-317/343).

Operators

United States Army Air Corps
2d Bombardment Group, Langley Field, Virginia
20th Bomb Squadron – operated B-3A and B-5A 1931–1932
49th Bomb Squadron – operated B-3A and B-5A 1931–1932
96th Bomb Squadron – operated B-3A and B-5A 1931–1932
4th Composite Group, Nichols Field, Luzon, Philippines
28th Bomb Squadron – operated B-3A 1932–1937
 2nd Observation Squadron- operated B-3A 1938–1940 
5th Composite Group, Luke Field, Territory of Hawaii
23d Bomb Squadron – operated B-5A 1932–1937
72d Bomb Squadron – operated B-5A 1932–1936
6th Composite Group, France Field, Panama Canal Zone
25th Bomb Squadron – operated B-3A 1932–1936
7th Bombardment Group, March Field, California
9th Bomb Squadron – operated B-3A 1931–1934
11th Bomb Squadron – operated B-3A 1931–1934
31st Bomb Squadron – operated B-3A 1931–1934
19th Bombardment Group, Rockwell Field, California
30th Bomb Squadron – operated B-3A 1932–1936
32d Bomb Squadron – operated B-3A 1932–1935
Air Corps Advanced Flying School, Kelly Field, Texas 
42d Bomb Squadron – operated B-3A and B-5A 1935–1936

Philippine Army Air Corps
10th Bombardment Squadron

Specifications (B-3A)

See also

References
Notes

Bibliography

 Andrade, John. U.S. Military Aircraft Designations and Serials since 1909. Leicester, UK: Midland Counties Publications, 1979, pp. 43, 135. .
 The Illustrated Encyclopedia of Aircraft (Part Work 1982–1985). London: Orbis Publishing, 1985, p. 2255. 
 Maurer, Maurer. Combat Squadrons of the Air Force, World War II. Maxwell AFB, Alabama: Air Force Historical Studies Office, 1982. .

External links

Encyclopedia of American Aircraft
Photograph of B-3 on the ground
Photograph of B-3 landing
USAF Museum article on LB-10
USAF Museum article on B-3

B-3
Light bombers
Keystone B-03
Biplanes
Twin piston-engined tractor aircraft